The Butlerian Jihad is a fictional historical event originally introduced in Frank Herbert's Dune novels:

 Butlerian Jihad, a summary of the event as portrayed in assorted Dune books
 Dune: The Butlerian Jihad (2002), the first book in the Legends of Dune series